Ballophilus rouxi is a species of centipede in the genus Ballophilus. It is found in New Caledonia. The original description of this species is based on specimens measuring up to 49 mm in length with 63 to 77 pairs of legs.

References 

Ballophilidae